The Quarry is Iain Banks's final novel, which was published posthumously in late June 2013. It deals with an autistic youth, Kit, and his father, Guy, a misanthrope who is dying of cancer.

The author, who died on 9 June 2013, was in the advanced phases of terminal gall bladder cancer at the time the book was being prepared for publication, although he did not know he had cancer until the book was almost finished. He then began to include his own experiences of the disease in the novel. The dates of publication of The Quarry were brought forward at Banks's request, and were 20 June 2013 in the UK and 25 June 2013 in the US. The Scotsman reviewer Hannah McGill, reflecting on Banks's condition at the time of writing, called it "a state-of-the-self book, a meaning-of-life book".

References

2013 British novels
British satirical novels
Existentialist novels
Little, Brown and Company books
Novels by Iain Banks
Novels published posthumously
British philosophical novels
Scottish novels